Tyrone Everton Marshall (born 12 November 1974) is a retired Jamaican footballer and current head coach of FC Cincinnati 2, the reserve team of Major League Soccer's FC Cincinnati.

Career

Youth and College
Marshall moved to the Fort Lauderdale, Florida area when he was twelve years old. He attended Lindsey Wilson College from 1994 to 1995 before transferring to Florida International University where he played on the men's soccer team from 1996 to 1997.

Professional

Colorado Rapids
Marshall was drafted by Colorado Rapids with the 11th overall pick of the 1998 MLS College Draft. He played only one game for Colorado, then was dealt, along with Jason Boyce, to Miami Fusion on 14 August 1998 in exchange for David Vaudreuil.

Miami Fusion and LA Galaxy
Marshall would spend the next three and a half seasons in Miami, starting as a forward and eventually drifting to the midfield and then defense. After the Fusion folded following the 2001 season, Marshall was selected by Los Angeles Galaxy as the ninth pick of the 2002 MLS Allocation Draft and helped LA to victory in MLS Cup 2002.

On 13 June 2007, Marshall received a red card for a tackle which broke the leg of FC Dallas forward Kenny Cooper in the 89th minute. The red card carries a mandatory one-game suspension and $250 fine, but the MLS Disciplinary Committee decided unanimously to extend the suspension two additional games and an additional fine of $1,250.

Toronto FC
Marshall was traded to Toronto FC for Edson Buddle on 13 June 2007 after five seasons with the Galaxy. Marshall cemented his place in Toronto's defense, and went on to make 16 starts during the 2007 season. Marshall managed to get revenge on his former side when Toronto earned their first win of the 2008 season in Los Angeles.

Seattle Sounders FC
Marshall was traded to Seattle Sounders FC on 10 February 2009 for allocation money. He scored his first goal for the Sounders against Chicago Fire as the game finished 1–1. He also assisted a goal by Steve Zakuani in a match against San Jose. However, in the 86th minute in a match against D.C. United, Marshall accidentally scored an own goal with his head, and the game finished 3–3. He scored his second goal for the club on 17 October, in a game against Kansas City Wizards.

Return to the Colorado Rapids
After the 2010 MLS season Seattle declined Marshall's contract option and Marshall elected to participate in the 2010 MLS Re-Entry Draft. On 15 December 2010 Marshall was selected by Colorado Rapids in Stage 2 of the Re-Entry draft. Marshall agreed to the terms of his contract on 3 January 2011 officially completing the transfer.

Marshall was released by Colorado on 16 November 2012. He entered the 2012 MLS Re-Entry Draft and became a free agent after going undrafted in both rounds of the draft.

International
Marshall was a regular with the Jamaica national team. He appeared in 83 matches from 2000–2010 before retiring from international football in January 2010, after appearing versus Canada.

Management

Marshall was named head coach of the River City Rovers of the USL Premier Development League for the 2014 season. In 2015 Marshall was named an assistant coach for Real Salt Lake. Marshall continued as an assistant coach when head coach Jeff Cassar was fired and replaced by Mike Petke, and again in 2019 when Petke was fired and replaced with Freddy Juarez.

He joined FC Cincinnati in February 2021 to coach their under-19 academy team and future under-23 squad. On September 27, 2021, Marshall was named interim head coach of FC Cincinnati's senior team for the remainder of the 2021 season following the dismissal of Jaap Stam. On February 22, 2022, FC Cincinnati announced that Marshall will be the first head coach of the team's MLS Next Pro reserve team, FC Cincinnati 2.

Career statistics

Club statistics

International Goals

Honours

Miami Fusion
Major League Soccer Supporters' Shield (1): 2001

Los Angeles Galaxy
Major League Soccer MLS Cup (2): 2002, 2005
Major League Soccer Supporters' Shield (1): 2002
Major League Soccer Western Conference Championship (2): 2002, 2005
Lamar Hunt U.S. Open Cup (1): 2005

Seattle Sounders FC
Lamar Hunt U.S. Open Cup (2): 2009, 2010

Individual
 CONCACAF Gold Cup Best XI (Honorable Mention): 2005

References

External links

 
 

1974 births
Living people
Colorado Rapids draft picks
Colorado Rapids players
Expatriate soccer players in Canada
Expatriate soccer players in the United States
FIU Panthers men's soccer players
Association football defenders
Jamaica international footballers
Jamaican expatriate footballers
Jamaican expatriate sportspeople in Canada
Jamaican expatriate sportspeople in the United States
Jamaican footballers
LA Galaxy players
Major League Soccer All-Stars
Major League Soccer players
Major League Soccer coaches
Miami Fusion players
MLS Pro-40 players
Sportspeople from Kingston, Jamaica
Toronto FC players
Seattle Sounders FC players
A-League (1995–2004) players
2003 CONCACAF Gold Cup players
2005 CONCACAF Gold Cup players
2009 CONCACAF Gold Cup players
2011 CONCACAF Gold Cup players
Real Salt Lake non-playing staff
Florida International University alumni
FC Cincinnati non-playing staff
FC Cincinnati coaches